Åke Hans Lennart Pousette (born 10 May 1949) is a Swedish physician and professor.

Biography
Pousette was born on 10 May 1949 in Stockholm. He defended his thesis at Karolinska Institute in 1976. His dissertation was Studies on the control of androgen responsiveness in rat. He was professor of andrology at Karolinska Institute in Stockholm from 2000 to 2010.

He has been married to Ulla Carlegrim Pousette (born 1949) since 1975.

References

1949 births
Living people
Andrologists
20th-century Swedish physicians
21st-century Swedish physicians
Physicians from Stockholm
Åke